Leader Magazine was a weekly pictorial magazine published in the United Kingdom. The magazine was first owned by Pearson and then by Odhams. Later it became part of Hulton Press. The headquarters of the magazine was in London. The last issue of the weekly was published on 10 June 1950 and It was incorporated in Picture Post on 17 June 1950.

Contributors included Stephen Potter (editor), Kay Dick (literary critic), Anthony Carson, Orson Welles, Edgar Lustgarten, Lesley Blanch, Leslie Illingworth, Eric Partridge, cartoonist Vicky, Stephen King-Hall. Theatre critic John Barber was also sub-editor at one time. Another drama critic was Herbert Farjeon. Kaye Webb was theatre correspondent from 1947-49.

Other contributors included 
Denzil Batchelor, 
Gordon Beckles, 
Prof. D. W. Brogan, 
Barbara Cartland, 
Hayden Church, 
Susan Garth, 
Walter Hingston, 
Robert Lantz,
Laurie Lee, 
Jean Paul Penez, 
John Maytime, 
Ruth Miller, 
Hugh Newman, 
Geoffrey Sharp, 
Charles Stuart, 
Stephen G. Watts, and
Eric Williams.

Notes

External links
 Website containing summary of editions from 9 April 1949 (Vol 6 no. 23) to 20 May 1950 (Vol 7 no. 29)

1950 disestablishments in the United Kingdom
Defunct magazines published in the United Kingdom
Magazines disestablished in 1950
Magazines with year of establishment missing
Magazines published in London
Weekly magazines published in the United Kingdom
Odhams Press magazines